Samuel Greerson Murray "Sam" Nesbitt (November 23, 1859 – February 23, 1938) was an apple exporter and political figure in Ontario. He represented Northumberland East in the Legislative Assembly of Ontario from 1908 to 1919 as a Conservative member.

He was born in Brighton, the son of James Nesbitt, a native of Ireland, and was educated in Brighton. In 1884, he married Eleanor M. Bibby. Nesbitt was president of the Canadian Canning Company. He served eight years as reeve of Brighton. In 1915, Nesbitt donated land and funds towards the construction of the Brighton Public School. He died in Brighton in 1938 and was buried at Mount Hope Cemetery.

References

External links

1859 births
1938 deaths
Progressive Conservative Party of Ontario MPPs